is a Japanese manga series written and illustrated by Masami Yuki. His initial attempt with the story ran in Shogakukan's Shōnen Sunday Zōkan from 1985 to 1988, but it was eventually abandoned. Over a decade later, Yuki began a reboot, which was serialized in Weekly Young Sunday (2002–2008) and Weekly Big Comic Spirits (2008). A sequel, titled Birdy the Mighty: Evolution, was serialized in Weekly Big Comic Spirits from 2008 to 2012.

In 1996, Birdy the Mighty was adapted into a four-episode original video animation (OVA) directed by Yoshiaki Kawajiri. A twenty-five episode anime television series adaptation, titled Birdy the Mighty: Decode, animated by A-1 Pictures and produced by Aniplex, was broadcast for two seasons in Japan on TV Saitama and other networks from July 2008 to March 2009.

Plot
Birdy Cephon Altera is a Federation agent chasing interplanetary criminals to the planet Earth. While in pursuit of one such criminal, she accidentally kills a high school boy named Tsutomu Senkawa. However, there is a way to keep him alive. He ends up being merged into Birdy's body and must remain so until the repair of his body is complete.

So, Tsutomu is stuck sharing a body with an attractive, strong, and impulsive space police agent while trying to keep his family and friends from finding out about Birdy. In the meantime, Birdy continues her investigation. Together, they take on a secretive group of evil aliens planning to perform experiments on the unsuspecting inhabitants of Earth.

Characters

Main

 (OVA)
 (TV)
A Federation police officer, she arrives on Earth in pursuit of alien criminals who are using the planet as a refuge. During one of her missions, she accidentally kills Tsutomu and has to fuse with him in order to keep him alive. In Birdy the Mighty Decode, she meets her childhood friend Nataru later admitting to Tsutomu that she is indeed in love with Nataru.
In the 2008 anime, her false identity on Earth is rising Japanese idol Shion Arita. She is accompanied by a robot named "Tuto". Birdy is an "Altan", a human-like alien, possibly from a planet orbiting the star Altair. More specifically, Birdy is an "Ixioran Altairian", a bio-engineered supersoldier bred for combat.

 (OVA)
 (TV)
A high school student who has his mind hosted within Birdy after being killed during her confrontation with an alien criminal. Birdy tries to let him live a normal life until his body is rebuilt.

Civilians

 (OVA)
 (TV)
Tsutomu's friend and classmate. In the OVA, she has a more prominent role whilst in the TV show she's just a minor character.

 (OVA)
 (TV)
Tsutomu's older sister. She does not live with Tsutomu and is rarely seen on the show. She comes by for random inspections and is first seen in the first episode saying goodbye to their parents.

 (TV)
A classmate of Tsutomu, Sayaka was originally a sickly girl until she was involved in a near fatal car accident and became the vessel for the superweapon, Ryunka. After fusing with Ryunka, Sayaka became far more cheerful and social, eventually becoming romantically involved with Tsutomu.

 (TV)
A young girl whose legs are recovering. She is very fond of Nataru and tends to be hostile towards Birdy because she thinks Birdy's trying to 'steal' him from her. She had also lost her older brother in the Ryunka incident.

Aliens

 (OVA)
 (TV)
An alien criminal who had been hiding on Earth in disguise. He's an Altarian henchman of Christella Revi.

 (OVA)
 (TV)
A rogue alien scientist who is the antagonist of the story.
 (ナタル)

Birdy's childhood friend. He lives on Earth as a refugee and pretends to be a human. Nataru is an Ixioran like Birdy and has the ability to teleport. In Birdy the Mighty Decode, he confesses to Birdy saying he's in love with her.
 

Skelezzo was once Birdy's advisor. He now resides on Altaria.

Media

Manga

Written and illustrated by Masami Yuki, Birdy the Mighty was serialized in Shogakukan's shōnen manga magazine Shōnen Sunday Zōkan from 1985 to 1988, being serialized while Yuki was working on Kyūkyoku Chōjin R in Weekly Shōnen Sunday. Yuki eventually abandoned the project, leaving it unfinished. Shogakukan released a single volume, which was listed as "volume 1", on July 18, 1996.

Over a decade later after its original run, Yuki decided to make a reboot of the manga, keeping certain details from the original work. The series ran in Shogakukan's seinen manga magazine Weekly Young Sunday from December 26, 2002, until the magazine ceased its publication on July 31, 2008. It later ran in Weekly Big Comic Spirits from September 6–22, 2008. Shogakukan collected its chapters in twenty tankōbon volumes, released from June 5, 2003, to October 3, 2008.

A sequel, titled Birdy the Mighty: Evolution, was serialized in Weekly Big Comic Spirits from October 11, 2008, to July 23, 2012. An epilogue chapter was published in Monthly Big Comic Spirits on August 27, 2012. Shogakukan collected its chapters in thirteen tankōbon volumes, released from February 27, 2009, to September 28, 2012.

Original video animation
The original Birdy the Mighty manga was adapted into a four-episode original video animation (OVA) by Madhouse and directed by Yoshiaki Kawajiri, released by Bandai Visual on VHS from July 25, 1996, to February 25, 1997. The four episodes were later re-released on DVD on June 25, 2001.

In North America, the OVA was licensed by Central Park Media, who released the episodes on two VHS sets in 1999, and on two DVD sets in 2004. The OVA was broadcast with an English dub on Starz Encore's Action channel in 2000. Central Park Media discontinued the series' distribution in 2006, before filing for bankruptcy in 2009.

Anime television series

An anime television series adaptation was announced by Weekly Young Sunday in 2006. Titled , the series was animated by A-1 Pictures and directed by Kazuki Akane, with Hiroshi Ōnogi handling the series' scripts. The series was first broadcast on TV Saitama (and later on twelve other terrestrial stations) for thirteen episodes from July 5 to September 27, 2008. Aniplex collected the episodes in seven DVDs, released from September 24, 2008, to March 25, 2009.

The series was followed by a second season, Birdy the Mighty: Decode 02, which was broadcast for twelve episodes from January 10 to March 28, 2009. Aniplex collected the episodes in six DVDs, released from April 22 to July 1, 2009. An unaired episode that connects the first and second seasons was included with the special DVD "Birdy the Mighty Decode: The Cipher", released on July 22, 2009.

In North America, the series was licensed by Funimation in 2009. The rights to the series expired on October 14, 2016.

Soundtracks
The music for Birdy the Mighty: Decode was composed by Yugo Kanno. The original soundtrack was released on September 24, 2008. The original soundtrack of Birdy the Mighty: Decode 02 was released on April 22, 2009. The second opening theme, "kiseki" ("Miracle"), was performed by Nirgilis, while the second ending theme, was performed by no3b.

Reception
Since its release in the West, Birdy the Mighty: Decode has received generally favorable reviews. Bryan Morton, from The Fandom Post, was positive toward the first season, citing the visuals and action as factors for it. In his review of the second season, while Morton stated that it was as enjoyable as the first, he was more critical of it. Several criticisms were drawn to Tsutomu and his friends being more sidelined in the story, and the animation, which he pointed out as, "...appearing to have been animated on a shoestring budget.". Bob Muir, from Japanator, noted the ending for the show made it feel rushed, but overall recommended the series, calling it "...just plain fun, with no insipid moe characters or deathly serious world domination plots to drag it down." Josh Viel of the Escapist, praised the visuals and soundtrack of the first season, bringing particular mention to the show's use of foreshadowing. On DVDTalk, Todd Douglass Jr. commended both seasons for their character development, though criticized the pacing of the first season, as well as the antagonists, calling one of them, "... more of a Cigarette Smoking Man kind of guy and really seems to just be some shadowy figure doing what he wants to do in the sidelines.". Further points were directed toward the second season for having the same issues, yet still recommended the series as a whole.

Legacy
Zack Snyder said the Birdy the Mighty anime series was an inspiration for his take on Man of Steel.

Notes

References

External links
  
  
 

1985 manga
1996 anime OVAs
2008 anime television series debuts
2008 manga
2009 anime television series debuts
A-1 Pictures
Action anime and manga
Central Park Media
Comedy anime and manga
Funimation
Madhouse (company)
Masami Yuki
Science fiction anime and manga
Seinen manga
Shōnen manga
Shogakukan manga